Australia has many forests of importance due to significant features, despite being one of the driest continents. , Australia has approximately 147 million hectares of native forest, which represents about 19% of Australia's land area. The majority of Australia's trees are hardwoods, typically eucalypts, rather than softwoods like pine. While softwoods dominate some native forests, their total area is judged insufficient to constitute a major forest type in Australia's National Forest Inventory. The Forests Australia website provides up-to-date information on Australia's forests. Detailed information on Australia's forests is available from Australia's State of the Forests Reports that are published every five years.

Forest types 
There are 458 forest communities distributed across Australia. These have been grouped into the following seven native forest types, which are characterised by dominant species and the structure of the forest:
 Rainforests
 Melaleuca forests
 Eucalypt forests
 Casuarina forests
 Callitris forests
 Acacia forests
 Mangrove forests
Plantation forests (softwood and hardwood) have been defined as an eighth group that covers trees planted for commercial use.

Government

Policies 
In Australia the states and territories are responsible for managing forests.  Guidance is primarily provided by the 1992 National Forest Policy Statement (NFPS). The NFPS allows for the inclusion of Regional Forest Agreements, which are 20-year plans for the management of native forests.

Departments 
Department of Primary Industry and Fisheries in the Northern Territory
Department of Agriculture, Fisheries and Forestry
Department of Primary Industries and its child agency Forests NSW
South Australian Forestry Corporation (trading as Forestry SA)
Forestry Tasmania
Department of Environment and Primary Industries
Department of Environment and Conservation

List of significant forests

Bushfires
Main article Bushfires in Australia

Over the years, Bushfires have destroyed a lot of trees and this in turn destroyed the habitat of many animals.

Gallery

See also 
 Deforestation in Australia
 Fauna of Australia
 Flora of Australia
 List of old-growth forests in Australia
 National Reserve System
 Protected areas of Australia
 Forestry in Tasmania
 Woodchipping in Australia

References